Hélder José Vaz Cabral (born 7 May 1984) is a Portuguese professional footballer who plays as a left back for S.C. Olhanense.

Club career
Born in Peniche, Cabral played youth football for three clubs, spending six years in local Grupo Desportivo de Peniche's system and entering it at the age of ten. He played his last two years as a junior with Vitória SC, going on to start his senior career in the lower leagues on loan.

Returning to Guimarães in the 2005 summer, Cabral played the first part of the 2005–06 season – being subsequently loaned to Moreirense F.C. in the second division – and the entire 2006–07 with the first team, leaving in June 2007 to fellow Primeira Liga club C.F. Estrela da Amadora: he scored his only goal of the campaign on 6 January 2008 in a 4–1 home win against his former employer, helping the Lisbon outskirts side narrowly avoid relegation after finishing 13th.

In January 2009, after an unassuming spell in Denmark with Vejle Boldklub, Cabral returned to his country and joined Académica de Coimbra. He was irregularly played during his spell, but started as the team won the 2012 edition of the Portuguese Cup – the first in 73 years – after defeating Sporting Clube de Portugal 1–0 in the final.

On 7 August 2013, Cabral signed a one-year deal with the option of a further season with APOEL FC from Cyprus. He made his debut for his new team on 19 September, coming on as an 86th-minute substitute in a 0–0 away draw against Maccabi Tel Aviv F.C. in the group stage of the UEFA Europa League.

On 29 January 2014, APOEL terminated Cabral's contract by mutual consent.

International career
Despite being born in Portugal, Cabral qualified to play for Cape Verde through his parents. In a January 2011 interview he added he would also like to represent the Portugal national team in the future, but preferred to "concentrate on (his) club duties for now".

Honours
Académica
Taça de Portugal: 2011–12

APOEL
Cypriot First Division: 2013–14
Cypriot Super Cup: 2013

References

External links
APOEL official profile

1984 births
Living people
People from Peniche, Portugal
Portuguese people of Cape Verdean descent
Portuguese footballers
Association football defenders
Primeira Liga players
Liga Portugal 2 players
Segunda Divisão players
Vitória S.C. players
G.D.R.C. Os Sandinenses players
Moreirense F.C. players
C.F. Estrela da Amadora players
Associação Académica de Coimbra – O.A.F. players
Vitória F.C. players
S.C. Olhanense players
Danish Superliga players
Vejle Boldklub players
Cypriot First Division players
APOEL FC players
AC Omonia players
Portuguese expatriate footballers
Expatriate men's footballers in Denmark
Portuguese expatriate sportspeople in Denmark
Expatriate footballers in Cyprus
Portuguese expatriate sportspeople in Cyprus
Sportspeople from Leiria District